KUGB-CD, virtual and UHF digital channel 28, is a low-power, Class A Novelisima affiliated television station licensed to Houston, Texas, United States. The station is owned by HC2 Holdings. KUGB-CD's studios are located on South Main Street in Stafford, and its transmitter is located near Missouri City, in unincorporated northeastern Fort Bend County.

History
The station began in 1988 as K56DP on channel 56, as a translator of KUBE-TV, then known as KLTJ. The call sign was changed to KHMV-LP on September 1, 1995.

KHMV moved to channel 28 around 2000, and was moved to channel 40, to make space for its digital signal.

The station's call sign was changed to KHMV-CA on March 6, 2006.

Due to Pappas Telecasting's continuing financial problems, KHMV was taken off the air November 2, 2007, and the station remained silent until after it was sold to Uniglobe Central America Network in March 2010. The new owners adopted the call sign KUGB-CA on April 2, 2010. Under Uniglobe's ownership, the station broadcast programming from Central America, notably El Salvador, Honduras, Costa Rica and Guatemala.

On January 4, 2011, the station was sold to Thomas Abraham. The FCC approved that transaction on February 18, 2011.

Citing a temporary loss of transmitter site, KUGB-CA temporarily went off the air April 25, 2011.

Under Thomas Abraham's ownership, the station has begun broadcasting religious programming on multiple subchannels.

The station changed its call sign again on August 17, 2012, to the current KUGB-CD.

On November 27, 2012, Uniglobe Central American Network Inc. LLC sold KUGB-CD to OTA Broadcasting, LLC, a company controlled by Michael Dell's MSD Capital, for $2,3 million in cash. OTA Broadcasting assumed control of KUGB-CD on February 13, 2013. In November 2017, the station was purchased by HC2 Holdings for $1.5 million.

Subchannels
The station's digital signal is multiplexed:

References

External links 

UGB-CD
Television channels and stations established in 1988
Low-power television stations in the United States
Innovate Corp.
Classic Reruns TV affiliates